Holy Terror is a 2011 graphic novel by Frank Miller which follows a costumed vigilante named The Fixer as he battles Islamic terrorists after an attack on Empire City.

The novel was originally proposed as Holy Terror, Batman! in 2006 but is no longer a project associated with the Batman character or DC Comics. Miller explained in 2010: "It's no longer a DC book. I decided partway through it that it was not a Batman story".

Development
As originally announced the plot revolved around Batman defending Gotham City from an attack by the Islamist terrorist group Al-Qaeda. According to Miller, the comic would have been a "piece of propaganda" in which Batman "kicks Al-Qaeda's ass."

Miller announced the graphic novel during a panel at the WonderCon comic book convention held in San Francisco in 2006. He summarized the work as "not to put too fine a point on it, a piece of propaganda... Superman punched out Hitler. So did Captain America. That's one of the things they're there for."

The title of the graphic novel is a reference to the War on Terror as well as the catchphrase ("Holy [something], Batman!") used by Burt Ward (Robin) in the 1960s Batman television series.

Later that year, on the anniversary of the September 11 attacks, NPR aired a brief memorial commentary by Miller, which provided insight into his inspiration for this project:

In a May 2007 interview, Miller relayed that he was still at work on the graphic novel, which he said was "bound to offend just about everybody". Miller also said he was about 100 pages into it with 50 remaining. The following year Miller said the series, until then being billed as Holy War, Batman, would no longer feature Batman. "As I worked on it, it became something that was no longer Batman," he clarified. "It's somewhere past that and I decided it's going to be part of a new series that I'm starting."

In 2010, Miller said he was no longer working on that project, clarifying that Holy Terror was in progress but without Batman. He later said it would feature a new character called The Fixer and not be published by DC. "It's no longer a DC book," he explained. "I decided partway through it that it was not a Batman story. The hero is much closer to Dirty Harry than Batman. It's a new hero that I've made up that fights Al Qaeda."

At San Diego Comic-Con International 2011, Miller further explained the reason to drop Batman and use The Fixer as the protagonist, saying "This character is much more well adjusted in committing terrible acts of violence on very evil people." Talking about the controversy the graphic novel might generate, he said he hoped the book accomplished its purpose in angering people.

Criticism
Holy Terror was controversial upon release; many comic book writers and reviewers argued that the novel's depiction of Muslims was Islamophobic. David Brothers of ComicsAlliance, in a review of the book, felt that Miller's writing "[simplifies] matters to an almost absurd level... the enemy in Holy Terror is not so much the terrorist organization, Al-Qaeda, but the religion of Islam." Similarly, Cyriaque Lamar of Io9 called the portrayal of terrorists "cartoonish... [gutting] Holy Terror of any emotional resonance." Spencer Ackerman of Wired wrote that the book was "one of the most appalling, offensive and vindictive comics of all time... Miller's Holy Terror is a screed against Islam, completely uninterested in any nuance or empathy toward 1.2 billion people he conflates with a few murderous conspiracy theorists."

In August 2006, fellow Batman writer Grant Morrison criticized the novel's concept, saying:

Miller responded generally to these criticisms on his blog, again referring to the book as intentional propaganda "without apology" and saying, "I'm too old to serve my country in any other way. Otherwise, I'd gladly be pulling the trigger myself." However, in 2018, Miller expressed regret for writing Holy Terror: "When I look at Holy Terror, which I really don't do all that often, I can really feel the anger ripple out of the pages... I don’t want to wipe out chapters of my own biography. But I'm not capable of that book again."

See also 
 Batman: Holy Terror, an Elseworlds one-shot published by DC Comics in 1991

References

External links
 
 Legendary Confirms Frank Miller's "Holy Terror", June 28, 2011

Superhero graphic novels
2011 graphic novels
American graphic novels
Comics by Frank Miller (comics)
Characters created by Frank Miller (comics)
War on terror
Religious controversies in comics
Books critical of Islam